Sir Thomas Drury, 1st Baronet FRS (1712 – 19 January 1759) of Wickham Hall near Maldon, Essex, and Overstone, Northamptonshire was an English politician who sat in the House of Commons between 1741 and 1747.

Background
Drury was born in London and baptised on 12 November 1712 at St Andrew's Church, Holborn; he was the son of Richard Drury of Colne, Hunts. by Joyce, daughter of Thomas Beacon of Great Ilford, Essex.  He matriculated at Merton College, Oxford in 1729, and was called to the bar at the Inner Temple, London, in 1736.

In 1737, as co-heir with his cousin Thomas Beacon Townsend (d.1737), Drury inherited a fortune estimated at £230,000, including an estate near Maldon, from his maternal uncle, Thomas Beacon, a brewer in Shoreditch, London.  His cousin died later that year and left Drury his share of the estate.  Fellow MP Joseph Townsend, who was the half-brother of Thomas Beacon Townsend, also benefited from the will.

Career
Drury was elected Member of Parliament for Maldon in 1741. He was created 1st Baronet Drury, of Overstone, co. Northampton on 16 February 1739 and was invested as a Knight.  He served as High Sheriff of Essex from 1740 to 1741 and High Sheriff of Northamptonshire from 1748 to 1749.  He was elected Fellow of the Royal Society in 1758.

Family
Drury married Martha, daughter of Sir John Tyrrell, 3rd Baronet, of Heron, Essex and Mary Dolliffe on 11 October 1737 at Somerset House Chapel, The Strand, London. They had a son who predeceased his father, and two daughters. Of the daughters:

Mary Ann married in 1761 John Hobart, 2nd Earl of Buckinghamshire, as his first wife. She had broken off an engagement to Lord Halifax, about two years before.
Jocosa Katherina married in 1770 Brownlow Cust, 1st Baron Brownlow, as his first wife.

References

|-

1712 births
1759 deaths
People from Holborn
Members of the Inner Temple
Alumni of Merton College, Oxford
High Sheriffs of Essex
High Sheriffs of Northamptonshire
Politicians from London
Members of the Parliament of Great Britain for English constituencies
British MPs 1741–1747
Baronets in the Baronetage of Great Britain
Fellows of the Royal Society
Members of Parliament for Maldon